Martin Knold (born January 14, 1976 in Fredrikstad, Norway) is a former Norwegian ice hockey player.

Knold began his career with Västra Frölunda, playing for them at junior and under-20 level.  He later signed with Linköpings HC of Division 1, ultimately helping the team win promotion to Elitserien. In 2004, Knold joined the Iserlohn Roosters of the Deutsche Eishockey Liga. In 2007, he signed for the Herning Blue Fox in the Oddset Ligaen in Denmark for one season but was unable to play due to injury.

Knold also played for the Norwegian national ice hockey team in eight World Championships.

Career statistics

External links
 

1976 births
Living people
Norwegian ice hockey defencemen
Linköping HC players
Iserlohn Roosters players
Sportspeople from Fredrikstad
Stjernen Hockey players
Norwegian expatriate ice hockey people